DZXO (1188 AM) is a radio station owned and operated by Vanguard Radio Network. The station's studio and transmitter are located at Pan-Philippine Highway, Brgy. Sangitan East, Cabanatuan. DZXO is one of the pioneer AM stations in the province.

References

Radio stations established in 1969
Radio stations in Nueva Ecija